Brightwen Binyon, FRIBA, (30 May 1846 – 21 September 1905) was a British architect.

Life
He was born at Headley Grange, Victoria Park, Manchester, the son of Edward Binyon (1791–1855), a sugar refiner and tea dealer, and his wife Jane née Brightwen (1805–1890).

He was educated at a Friends School (formerly Stramongate School) in Kendal, before training as an architect under Alfred Waterhouse between 1863 and 1871. Later he gained membership of the RIBA. He then travelled around the continent after which he came to Ipswich. He lived with his mother at 43 Fonnereau Road, Ipswich in 1874.
On 18 September 1879 in Darlington, he married Rachel Mary Cudworth (1853–1949) of Darlington. She was the daughter of William Cudworth and Mary Thompson.
They then lived at 5 Henley Road, Ipswich with Brightwen having an architect’s office at 36 Princes Street, Ipswich. Henry Percy Adams was later articled to him. He had many commissions in Suffolk including the Corn Exchange, the Ipswich Board School in Bramford Road, Ipswich and the Concert Pavilion, Felixstowe.
In 1882, Ipswich council held a design competition for the Corn Exchange. Out of 15 entries to the council, he won using the nom-de-plume "North Light".
In 1890, Sunderland, County Durham held an architectural design competition for a town hall on Fawcett Street. This competition was judged by Alfred Waterhouse and was won by Brightwen Binyon. He beat Frank Caws (another renowned local architect). The competition was dogged by accusations of corruption due to the link between Binyon and Waterhouse.
In 1892, he won another design competition, beating 44 other designs for the Barrett Browning Institute in Ledbury, Hertfordshire. The design was based on the timber-framed Market House, which was opposite the site. It was completed in 1896. Nikolaus Pevsner was, however, not impressed by its style.
In 1897, he was the winner of design of the Felixstowe Spa and Winter Garden. But the design was not implemented.

He became a member of Ipswich Fine Art Club (during 1875–1903) and an exhibitor during 1881–85. He also exhibited at the Royal Academy between 1887 and 1895. In about 1892, the family moved to 'The Cedars', Anglesea Road, Ipswich and, after being in practice for over 25 years, he retired in 1897. He died in Bushey, Hertfordshire on 21 September 1905.

Brightwen and Rachel had four children including Basil Binyon (1885–1947), a well-known electrical engineer appointed a director of the BBC in 1922, Mary Sims Binyon (1882–1976), an artist and modeller, Olive Binyon (1888–1971) and Janet Binyon (1880–1963).
His grandson was the conservation architect Sir Bernard Feilden (1919–2008).

Brightwen Binyon was the 2nd cousin once removed of poet Robert Lawrence Binyon who wrote the poem 'For the Fallen' .

List of works

 1875 Wallpaper design (now in Victoria and Albert Museum).
 1875 – Burlington Road Baptist Church, Ipswich .
 1872 – The Grove, Stanmore, re-modelling in half-timber style. The home of Naturlaist Eliza Brightwen.
 1879 – Bank Premises, Sudbury, Suffolk 
 1880 – Thistleton Hall, Suffolk 
 1881 – Sanford Street Boys’ School, Swindon, Wiltshire
 1881  Church Lodge,(No 1 Uxbridge Road), Stanmore 
 1878 – Municipal Buildings, Great Yarmouth, Norfolk 
 1879 – Ipswich Post Office, Suffolk 
 1879 – Ipswich School of Art 
 1879 – Queenstown school Swindon (closed 1990/demolished in 1993)
 1879-1881 – Gilberts Hill, Dixon Street, Swindon 
 1881 - Yarra Primary School, Richmond, Victoria, Australia
 1882 – Ipswich Corn Exchange & Shops, Suffolk 
 1882 Bramford Road School, Ipswich
 1882-1883 – Hill House, Ipswich
 1886 – Public Library & Museum, Folkestone, Kent 
 1888 – Seaside Villas, Felixstowe, Suffolk 
 1888-1891 – Enlargement of Stanmore Hall for William Knox D'Arcy.
 1890 – Sunderland Town Hall (later demolished in 1971)
 1890 – Swindon Town Hall (Grade II listed building)  Town Hall, Regent Circus
 1890 - Nethaniah Almshouse, Over Stoke
 1892-1893 The Mechanics Institute, Emlyn Square, Swindon, (Considerably enlarged)
 1893 – New Public Library, Colchester
 1893 – Warehouse, North Street, Colchester 
 1895 – Granary, Hythe Quay, Colchester 
 1896 – The Elizabeth Barrett Browning Institute, Ledbury

References

19th-century English architects
1846 births
1905 deaths
Architects from Manchester
People of the Victorian era
Fellows of the Royal Institute of British Architects
Ipswich artists